Josef Schleich (1902 – 7 February 1949) was an Austrian citizen. During the time of National Socialism, he helped many Jews as a smuggler to cross the border to Yugoslavia.

Life and career 
Schleich was born in Graz, Styria. He was a poultry farm owner. Until the "Anschluss" (German for link-up) in 1938 when Austria was incorporated into Greater Germany by Nazi Germany Schleich increased his income by smuggling flints and saccharin to Yugoslavia.

After the "Anschluss" Schleich started to expand his business. As Jews were no longer welcome by other countries (due to having no assets after paying high taxes), Schleich started to teach farming. After the end of this education a certificate helped Jews to emigrate. Because too many certificates were issued Schleich lost his credit and customers.

Schleich did not give up and changed his business one more time - he became a smuggler. With his help many Jews were able to cross the border and save their lives. For the transport to Yugoslavia, he pretended to be a travel guide. His business flourished and he earned some extra money because he charged 670 German Reichsmark per person. Before the start of the Balkans campaign his activity was tolerated by the Nazi authorities. On 12 March 1941 Schleich and his colleagues were arrested, and his business was destroyed.

As a result, he was sentenced to ten months in prison and afterwards drafted to the "Wehrmacht" (armed forces of Germany).

In 1945, he returned to Graz, Styria. Because some Jews failed to cross the border with his help as a smuggler, they accused him. The reason was that he had taken advantage of the Jews' assets. For lack of evidence his lawsuit was cancelled.

Schleich died on 7 February 1949 as a result of cirrhosis of the liver.

The work of Schleich remained controversial in Austria. On the one hand he had earned money – that was against the law – but on the other hand he rescued hundreds of lives. In 2002 the Braunau Contemporary History Days had a discussion on this topic.

Literature 
 Hannelore Fröhlich, Spurensuche. Mit einem Nachwort von Walter Brunner. Steirische Verlagsanstalt, Graz 1999. 
 Hannelore Fröhlich, Judenretter - Abenteurer - Lebemann: Josef Schleich. Spurensuche einer Tochter. LIT Verlag Dr. W. Hopf, Berlin 2007. .

References

External links 
 Das Reisebüro des Josef Schleich (PDF)

1902 births
1949 deaths
Austrian farmers
People from Graz
Smugglers